ATMA Atyrau Airport  is an airport located  northwest of Atyrau, Kazakhstan.

History 

ATMA obtained the operational rights of ATMA Atyrau Airport when the airport was privatized as a build and operate model in 1994. ATMA is a joint company between Mağdenli Yer Hizmetleri and Atyrau Regional Administration with both parties having a 50% share. It is the only airport in Atyrau and one of the thirteen international airports in Kazakhstan.

The region is crucial for Kazakhstan's economy as it is very close to oil exploration sites and platforms on the Caspian Sea. The city is the base town for many oil and construction companies.

In 2007, ATMA completed the construction of the new terminal building and a new longer runway. Passengers can also benefit from the modernized CIP and VIP lounges. There is Wi-Fi internet access all over the terminal including CIP and VIP lounges. As a result of the renovation project, conveyor belt system is installed in both international and domestic arrival terminals and computerized check in banks became operational for easier passenger ticket processing. Boarding is done by transporting passengers by bus from the terminal to the plane.

In 2019, it was the 5th busiest airport in Kazakhstan, as 937,032 passengers passed through the airport.

Airlines and destinations

Passenger

Cargo

See also
 Extreme points of Earth – Lowest attainable by transportation
 List of places on land with elevations below sea level

References

External links
Atyrau Airport official website

Airports in Kazakhstan
Buildings and structures in Atyrau